The Honda CB1300 Super Four is a CB series  standard Honda motorcycle released in 1998 as a successor to the CB1000 Super Four. Its engine, with minor modifications, came from the X4, released in the previous year. In 2003, the CB1300 received a slightly different engine which lacked cooling fins.  

The models made before 2003 with the faux cooling fins were known internally as the SC40 while the models made after 2003 were known as the SC54.  

Beginning in 2005, Honda offered two versions of the CB1300: the standard, unfaired model, and the Super Bol D'Or (in Europe the CB1300S), with half fairing.

The CB1300 has never been sold by authorized dealers in the United States or Canada. Gray market importers brought in small numbers.

The 2018 model, only available in Japan, had some performance and exhaust changes bringing power up to 109 hp. The 2021 model adds a throttle-by-wire system with riding modes and cruise control.

Notes

External links 

 
 Official press release, February 10, 1998

CB1300
Standard motorcycles
Motorcycles introduced in 1998